The Valdavia River is a Spanish river that rises in the foothills of the Sierra del Brezo (Monastery of San Roman) in Santibáñez de la Peña; it passes through the valle de la Valdavia, to which it gives its name, through villages such as Congosto de Valdavia, Buenavista de Valdavia, Villaeles de Valdavia and Castrillo de Villavega; receives the waters of the Río Boedo in Osorno; and enters the Burgos province to flow into the Pisuerga next to Melgar de Fernamental. This last section that goes from the mouth of the Boedo to its junction with the Pisuerga, is called Abánades River.

Etymology 
Its name is made up of the words "valle" and "avia" or "abia" which appears in the province of Palencia under the name of Abia de las Torres. The term "abia" or "avia" is also found in other rivers such as the Avión, a tributary of the Valdavia.

"Abia" or "avia" seems to be a pre-Roman toponym.

See also 
 County of La Valdavia

References 

Rivers of Spain
Rivers of Castile and León
Rivers of Palencia
Rivers of Burgos